Miganoush "Migan" Megardichian is a Canadian politician, who was appointed to Toronto City Council on June 26, 2018.

She represented what was designated Ward 41, Scarborough—Rouge River, which had been vacant since the resignation of Chin Lee in May 2018, and she served the remainder of the term until the following municipal election in October 2018.  She did not stand for election in 2018.

Megardichian is a resident of Scarborough Centre, and speaks Armenian, Persian, French, Spanish and Russian. She serves on the Board for Skate Ontario and Freestyle Canada.

References

External links
 Councillor Migan Megardichian

21st-century Canadian politicians
Toronto city councillors
Living people
Year of birth missing (living people)
Canadian people of Armenian descent
Women municipal councillors in Canada
21st-century Canadian women politicians